The 2010 FEI World Cup Jumping Final was the final of the FEI World Cup Jumping 2009/2010. It was the 32nd final of the FEI World Cup Jumping show jumping series and was held at the Palexpo in Le Grand-Saconnex near Geneva, Switzerland, from April 14 to April 18, 2010.

Meredith Michaels-Beerbaum of Germany was the defending champion, having won the 2009 final in Las Vegas, Nevada. She didn't start at the 2010 FEI World Cup Jumping Final because of the birth of her daughter shortly previous to this event.

The champion of the 2010 FEI World Cup Jumping Final is Marcus Ehning of Germany, who started with the horses Noltes Küchengirl and Plot Blue in this World Cup Final.

Participating riders 

° extra competitor (Extra competitors are riders, who live in a country, which is not part of the World Cup League of the country of this riders nationality. These riders are at first part of the World Cup League of the country in which they live. At the end of the season this riders deducted from the final score of this league. If they have just as many or more points as the last qualified rider, they have the chance to start at the World Cup Final.)

 Jessica Kürten canceled her participation at the World Cup final because of a training accident.
Also  Yuri Mansur Guerios, second placed rider in the South American League could not start at the World Cup Final. He lost his World Cup horse Ideal de Balia because of colic.

Results

Final I 
Thursday, April 15, 2010 - 7:15 pm to ca. 9:00 pm 
Speed and Handiness Competition

(Top Ten of 43 Competitors)

Final II 
Friday, April 16, 2010 - 7:15 pm to ca. 9:30 pm
Competition with one jump off, Round I not against the clock, jump-off against the clock

(Top Ten of 42 Competitors)

 Abdullah Al Sharbatly didn't start in Final II of the 2010 FEI World Cup Jumping Final.

Final III 
Sunday, April 18, 2010 - 1:30 pm to ca. 4:40 pm
Competition over two different rounds, both not against the clock

(Top Ten of 29 Competitors)

Final result

DNS = did not startRET = retired° = penalties in first round of the Final III, not qualified for the second round of Final III8/RET = 8 penalties in first round of the Final III, retired in the second round of the Final IIIDISQ = horse disqualified, see below 

A jump-off was not necessary.

Sapphire, the horse ridden by  McLain Ward, has been eliminated from the second round of the FEI World Cup Final and disqualified from the rest of the event following a positive hypersensitivity test. The FEI appointed veterinarian stressed that there was no indication or evidence of any malpractice by McLain Ward or any member of the team. 

In July 2010 the FEI and McLain Ward agreed to avoid extensive litigations, that Sapphire was incorrectly eliminated. However, Sapphire’s disqualification from the final round of the World Cup remains in place. The FEI has also decided to develop mandatory guidelines for hypersensitivity tests.

References

External links

World Cup Jumping Final
FEI World Cup Jumping Finals
Sports competitions in Geneva
2010 in Swiss sport
21st century in Geneva
Equestrian sports competitions in Switzerland
International sports competitions hosted by Switzerland